Il mondo della luna is a 1765 opera by Pedro António Avondano, which was the first opera by a Portuguese composer to be performed in the Portuguese court. The libretto by Carlo Goldoni had been written originally for a setting by Galuppi in 1750.

Recording
Avondano: Il mondo della luna - Artistic directors: Marta Araújo, Marcos Magalhães; Os Músicos do Tejo, Teatro Nacional de São Carlos, Lisbon 1994;  Naxos CD: 8.660487-88

References

1765 operas

 
Italian-language operas
Operas
Drammi giocosi
 
Libretti by Carlo Goldoni
Science fiction operas
Operas set on the Moon